Carl Johan Schönherr (10 June 1772 – 28 March 1848) was a Swedish entomologist who revised the taxonomy of beetles, including weevils.

Born in Stockholm, Schönherr was son of a German immigrant who had established himself as a silk manufacturer. At the age of nineteen, he took over the business together with his mother and developed it into a considerable size, with about 200 workers. In 1805, he entered partnership with Erik Lundgren, and in 1811 he sold the business to him, while retiring to his manor Sparresäter in Lerdala outside Skara in Västergötland, where he died in 1848.

Schönherr had taken an interest in entomology since the age of twelve and was later further stimulated through his friendship with Gustaf Johan Billberg, his brother-in-law from his second marriage.

He was an eminent coleopterist co-operating with Carl Henrik Boheman and Leonard Gyllenhaal. Schönherr wrote . Paris, Roret. (1833-1845) in which many new species were described.

Schönherr was elected a member of the Royal Swedish Academy of Sciences in 1809.

Several species have been named in his honour including; Eupholus schoenherrii

Notes

References 
 Ehnström, Bengt, "Schönherr, Carl Johan", Svenskt biografiskt lexikon, vol. 31, p. 754-757.

External links
Zoologica Göttingen State and University Library

1772 births
1848 deaths
18th-century Swedish businesspeople
19th-century Swedish educators
Swedish entomologists
Members of the Royal Swedish Academy of Sciences
Swedish people of German descent
Scientists from Stockholm
19th-century Swedish scientists